Krasewicze-Czerepy  is a village in the administrative district of Gmina Siemiatycze, within Siemiatycze County, Podlaskie Voivodeship, in north-eastern Poland.

The village has a population of 30.

References

Krasewicze-Czerepy